VMR may refer to:
 Valley Metro Rail
 Variance-to-mean ratio
 Vertical Market Reseller
 Video Mixing Renderer, a DirectShow filter
 Virtual Medical Record
 Victorian Miniature Railway